

Wilred (or Wilfredus) was a medieval Bishop of Dunwich.

Wilred was consecrated in 825 and died between 845 and 870.

References

External links
 

Bishops of Dunwich (ancient)
Year of birth missing
9th-century deaths